= Owelu =

Village in Imo state, Nigeria

Coordinates: 5°31′06.7″N 7°04′25.3″E

Owelu is a village in Imo State, southeastern Nigeria.
